SFOG may refer to:
Six Flags Over Georgia
Swedish association of obstetrics and gynecology
Solid-fuel oxygen generator